Air Vice Marshal Sir John de Milt Severne,  (15 August 1925 – 4 October 2015) was a senior Royal Air Force officer and aerobatic display pilot. Senior appointments included Commanding Officer of RAF Kinloss, Commandant of the Central Flying School, Air Officer Commanding the Southern Maritime Air Region, and Captain of the Queen's Flight. In 1960, he won the King's Cup Race and the British air racing championship.

Honours and decorations
On 1 March 1955, Severne was awarded the Air Force Cross (AFC) "in recognition of gallantry and devotion to duty". The actions that led to him being awarded the AFC were described in the London Gazette as follows: 

In the 1968 New Year Honours, Severne was appointed an Officer of the Order of the British Empire (OBE). This was in recognition of his role in the withdrawal of British forces from Aden in 1967. On 15 December 1988, he was appointed a Knight Commander of the Royal Victorian Order (KCVO) for his service as Captain of the Queen's Flight. On 17 May 1991, he was appointed a Deputy Lieutenant (DL) of the County of Somerset.

Other medals awarded to Severne were the War Medal 1939–1945, the General Service Medal with South Arabia clasp, the Queen Elizabeth II Coronation Medal and the Queen Elizabeth II Silver Jubilee Medal.

Autobiography
Severne wrote an autobiography in the 2000s. The foreword was written by Prince Philip, Duke of Edinburgh, who knew Severne through his role in the Queen's flight and also from an earlier period when he served as equerry to the Duke.

References

1925 births
2015 deaths
British air racers
Deputy Lieutenants of Somerset
Knights Commander of the Royal Victorian Order
Officers of the Order of the British Empire
Recipients of the Air Force Cross (United Kingdom)
Royal Air Force air marshals
Royal Air Force personnel of World War II
British military personnel of the Aden Emergency